Meziříčko may refer to:

 Meziříčko (Žďár nad Sázavou District)
 Meziříčko (Třebíč District)